Cancer Chemotherapy and Pharmacology is a peer-reviewed medical journal covering oncological pharmacotherapy. It was established in 1978 and is published by Springer Science+Business Media. The editors-in-chief are Jan Hendrik Beumer (University of Pittsburgh School of Pharmacy) and Étienne Chatelut (Institut Claudius-Regaud). According to the Journal Citation Reports, the journal has a 2020 impact factor of 3.333.

References

External links 
 

Pharmacology journals
Oncology journals
Publications established in 1978
Monthly journals
Springer Science+Business Media academic journals
English-language journals